Zenith Oilfield Technology was an artificial lift service company founded in 2003 and based in Inverurie, United Kingdom with offices in Middle East, North Africa, China and Southeast Asia. In 2012, the company was acquired by Lufkin Industries for £81.1 million. Lufkin was in turn rolled into General Electric Oil and Gas (GE Oil & Gas), today part of Baker Hughes.

References

2003 establishments in Scotland
2012 disestablishments in Scotland
Energy companies established in 2003
Defunct energy companies of the United Kingdom
British companies disestablished in 2012
British companies disestablished in 2003